The 2021 Libertarian National Committee chair special election was held on July 11, 2021 by the Libertarian National Committee (LNC), the governing body of the United States Libertarian Party, to elect their next chairperson, after their previous chair, Joe Bishop-Henchman, resigned due to a internal party controversy.

After five rounds of rank-choice voting by the committee, Whitney Bilyeu was elected to serve the rest of Bishop-Henchman's term, defeating 5 other candidates.

Background

New Hampshire controversy and Bishop-Henchman resignation 
In June 2021, the Libertarian Party's New Hampshire affiliate wrote Tweets calling for "legalizing child labor", repealing the Civil Rights Act of 1964, and reopening Gitmo "so that Anthony Fauci and every governor that locked their state down can be sent there". In response, the Chair of the NH affiliate, Jilletta Jarvis, formed a new state affiliate and took control of the old affiliate's digital assets and Twitter account on June 12. The move was widely condemned by the party, including former US congressman Justin Amash and the party's 2020 VP nominee Spike Cohen, and Jarvis was expelled as Chair by the old affiliate

A letter surfaced allegedly from LNC chair Joe Bishop-Henchman, which recognized Jarvis's affiliate. This caused many LNC members to call for the chair to be expelled. Bishop-Henchman however denied ever writing the letter or supporting Jarvis's actions. On June 16, Bishop-Henchman introduced a motion to the LNC to disaffiliate the NH affiliate, which would have paved the way for Jarvis's affiliate to be recognized. Bishop-Henchman officially resigned after the LNC rejected the motion 12-2.

Post-resignation 
LNC Vice Chair Ken Moellman from Kentucky assumed the role of Acting Chair after the resignation, until a new Chair could be elected.

Candidates 
 Whitney Bilyeu, chair of the Libertarian Party of Texas and member of the LNC from the 7th region
 Steve Dasbach, former LNC chair (1993-1998), and manager for Jo Jorgensen's 2020 presidential campaign
 Tony D'Orazio, LNC chair candidate in 2020
 Chuck Moulton
 Joshua Smith, LNC At-large member, and LNC chair candidate in 2018 and 2020
 Christopher Thrasher, Chair of the Libertarian Party Ballot Access Committee and Director for Lincoln Chafee's 2020 presidential campaign

Results 
No one won a majority of votes in the first round. Steve Dasbach, Tony D'Orazio, and Chuck Moulton were eliminated in the subsequent rounds, and Whitney Bilyeu received all the transfer votes, winning a majority on the fifth round.

See also 
 2017 Democratic National Committee chairmanship election
 2017 Republican National Committee chairmanship election

References 

Libertarian National Committee chair special election
Libertarian National Committee chair special election